LME Zinc stands for a group of spot, forward, and futures contracts, trading on the London Metal Exchange (LME), for delivery of special high-grade Zinc of 99.995% purity minimum that can be used for price hedging, physical delivery of sales or purchases, investment, and speculation. Producers, semi-fabricators, consumers, recyclers, and merchants can use Zinc futures contracts to hedge Zinc price risks and to reference prices.

As of December 31, 2019, LME Zinc contracts are associated with 51,200 tonnes of physical zinc stored in LME approved warehouses around the world, or around 0.4% of 2019 world zinc production of 13 million metric tonnes. Despite the small share of physical Zinc associated with LME Zinc contracts, their prices act as reference prices for physical global Zinc transactions. This practice started in the 1970s, when base metals producers started using LME futures contract prices as reference prices for spot market transactions.

Contract description
LME Zinc contracts trade on the London Metal Exchange.
The contracts require physical delivery of the asset for settlement, and deliverable assets for the contracts are 25 tonnes of high grade primary Zinc. The contracts prices are quoted in US dollars per tonne. LME prices have minimum tick sizes of $0.50 per tonne (or $12.50 for one contract) for open outcry trading in the LME Ring and electronic trading on LMEselect, while minimum tick sizes are reduced for inter-office telephone trading to $0.01 per tonne (or $0.50 for one contract). Carry trades involving Zinc futures also have reduced minimum tick sizes at $0.01 per tonne. Contracts are organized along LME's prompt date (or delivery date) structure.

Prompt date structure
LME offers three groups of LME Zinc contracts with daily, weekly, and monthly delivery dates. Contracts with daily settlement dates are available from two days to three months in the future, which means that on 2020-05-12, contracts with daily delivery dates for 2020-05-14, 2020-05-18, 2020-05-19 ... 2020-08-10, 2020-08-11, and 2020-08-12 are available for trading. Contracts with weekly settlement dates are available from three months to six months in the future, which means that on 2020-05-12, contracts with weekly delivery dates for 2020-08-12, 2020-08-19, 2020-08-26 ... 2020-11-12, 2020-11-18, and 2020-11-25 are available for trading. Contracts with monthly settlement dates are available from six months to 123 months in the future, which means that on 2020-05-12, contracts with monthly delivery dates for 2020-05-20, 2020-06-17, 2020-07-15, ... 2020-06-19, 2020-07-17, and 2030-08-21 are available for trading.

Price discovery
LME Zinc futures contract prices serves as a platform for Zinc price discovery because futures markets are more publicly visible and more accessible, due to lower transaction costs, for a larger number of buyers and sellers than the cash market. A larger number of buyers and sellers in the futures market allows those market participants to incorporate more demand and supply information into the futures price compared with the cash price. Empirical tests have shown that LME Zinc spot and futures markets are closely linked, although sometimes the spot market serves as a source of price discovery for the LME Zinc futures market rather than the reverse.

As a financial asset
LME Zinc futures prices are also a part of both the Bloomberg Commodity Index and the S&P GSCI commodity index, which are benchmark indices widely followed in financial markets by traders and institutional investors. Its weighting in these commodity indices give LME Zinc prices non-trivial influence on returns of investment funds and portfolios.

Related derivatives
LME also offers other derivatives related to primary Zinc. Options, TAPOs, Monthly Average Futures, and LMEminis.

Zinc contracts are also available for trading on the Chicago Mercantile Exchange (CME). The CME Zinc futures contract are for 25 metric tonnes of primary Zinc and prices are quoted in US dollars per tonne; 12 consecutive monthly CME Zinc contracts are available for trading.

Financial market conventions and empirical studies have grouped Nickel futures contracts with other base metals futures contracts together as an asset class or a sub-asset class. The Base Metals grouping usually includes futures contracts on Aluminium (sometimes including Aluminium Alloy contracts), Copper, Lead, Nickel, Tin, and Zinc. These are also sometimes called Industrial Metals, Non-ferrous Metals, and Non-precious Metals. All of the metals in this group have associated LME contracts available for trading.

References 

Futures markets